Hopliteccopsis is a genus of moths belonging to the subfamily Olethreutinae of the family Tortricidae.

Species
Hopliteccopsis amemorpha Diakonoff, 1963
Hopliteccopsis crocostoma Diakonoff, 1992
Hopliteccopsis maura Diakonoff, 1983

See also
List of Tortricidae genera

References

External links
tortricidae.com

Tortricidae genera
Olethreutinae
Taxa named by Alexey Diakonoff